San Fernando de Henares is a municipality in Spain, in the province and autonomous community of Madrid. It has an area of 39.9 km² and 41,380 inhabitants. Its agricultural production includes olives, cereals, vegetables, cattle and wool. Its industries include metalworking, mechanical engineering, food processing and graphic arts.

History

In 1746 King Philip V bought the area where San Fernando now stands to install a royal fabric factory.  After the king's death shortly thereafter, the project was developed by Ferdinand VI, who appointed Ventura de Argumosa as the governor of the Royal Place.

Around the factory workers' dwellings were built, which resulted in the origin of the town. In front of the factory a great square was opened (at present named Plaza de España) which was linked with another now named Plaza de Fernando VI. The whole area has been recently declared a historic and artistic monument so it cannot be modified, to protect the original houses that still remain.

Throughout its 200-year history, the municipality has suffered ups and downs. Its emblematic building, the factory, has been intended for several uses, notably as a hospice. Currently only the main façade stands; has been restored and incorporated into the new city hall.

Communications
Direct access form the A II (km 15) and the M-40 and M-45 highways (Exits 27 and 32, respectively)
Public transport
Bus from Madrid, (Avenida de América, Ciudad Líneal and Vicálvaro) línes 281 to 289)
Also UR-2 and U-1 lines into the city.
Metro station.

Politics

Twin towns – sister cities
San Fernando de Henares is twinned with:
 Vaslui, Romania

References

External links

San Fernando de Henares 

 
Municipalities in the Community of Madrid